Yuval Spungin (or Yuval Shpungin, ; born 3 April 1987) is an Israeli footballer who plays for Hapoel Kfar Shalem. He has played for the Israel national under-17 football team, the Israel national under-18 football team, the Israel national under-19 football team, the Israel national under-21 football team, and the Israel national football team. He won a gold medal with Team Israel in the 2005 Maccabiah Games. He has also played for Maccabi Tel Aviv, AC Omonia, RAEC Mons, Ironi Kiryat Shmona, F.C. Ashdod, and Hapoel Marmorek.

Spungin was born in Ramat Gan, Israel. Spungin's family are of Estonian extraction and he holds an Estonian passport.

Club career

Spungin won a gold medal with Team Israel, alongside Itay Shechter, in the 2005 Maccabiah Games.

In January 2010, Spungin signed a three-year contract with AC Omonia, starting from June 2010.
In July 2013, Spungin signed a two-year contract with R.A.E.C. Mons.

In the summer of 2014, Spungin returned to Israel and signed with Maccabi Tel Aviv. At the beginning of 2014–15 season he played few games before suffering from injuries. On May 17, 2015, he returned to play after 8 months in the championship match against Ironi Kiryat Shmona F.C. which Maccabi won 2–1. On May 22, 2018 Maccabi Tel Aviv released Spungin after he finished his contract.

On May 24, 2018, Spungin signed to Israeli Premier League club Ironi Kiryat Shmona.

On 10 July 2019 Spungin signed the Liga Alef club Hapoel Marmorek.

National career
On 7 March 2007 he made his debut in the Israel National team in a friendly game against Ukraine.
On 24 March 2007 was his first appearance in an official international game against England.

Career statistics

Honours

Club

Maccabi Tel Aviv
Israeli Premier League: 2014–15
 Israel State Cup: 2014–15 
Toto Cup: 2008–09, 2014–15, 2017–18

AC Omonia
Cypriot Cup: 2011, 2012
Cyprus FA Shield: 2010, 2012

References

External links

1987 births
Israeli Jews
Living people
Jewish footballers
Israeli footballers
Association football defenders
Israel international footballers
Maccabi Tel Aviv F.C. players
AC Omonia players
R.A.E.C. Mons players
Hapoel Ironi Kiryat Shmona F.C. players
F.C. Ashdod players
Hapoel Marmorek F.C. players
Hapoel Kfar Shalem F.C. players
Israeli Premier League players
Belgian Pro League players
Cypriot First Division players
Maccabiah Games competitors for Israel
Maccabiah Games medalists in football
Maccabiah Games gold medalists for Israel
Competitors at the 2005 Maccabiah Games
Expatriate footballers in Cyprus
Expatriate footballers in Belgium
Israeli expatriate sportspeople in Cyprus
Israeli expatriate sportspeople in Belgium
Israeli expatriate footballers
Israeli people of Estonian-Jewish descent
Footballers from Ramat Gan
Israel under-21 international footballers